Mirco Gennari (born 29 March 1966 in City of San Marino, San Marino) is a Sammarinese former footballer who played as a defender. With 48 caps earned between 1992 and 2003, Gennari was previously the most capped player in the history of the San Marino national team before being surpassed by Andy Selva, who finished with 74.

He began his career with S.S. Cosmos before moving to A.C. Juvenes/Dogana in 1993. In 1998, he moved across the border to play for A.C. Rimini in Italy, before returning to San Marino to play for S.S. Virtus in 2002. He returned to Juvenes for the 2005–06 season before moving on again to S.C. Faetano. He left Faetano after two seasons in 2008, and spent his last four seasons with four clubs, including S.S. Folgore Falciano in 2008–09 and S.P. La Fiorita in 2009–10. He returned to the club where he started his career, Cosmos, for the 2010–11 season and spent his last season in football, 2011–12, with S.S. San Giovanni.

Sources
Associazione Calciatori Over 35. Press release: Risultati del “8° TROFEO UNICEF SAN MARINO” (22 June 2009). Published on www.libertas.sm
Rec.Sport.Soccer Statistics Foundation. Mirco Gennari - International Appearances
Shaw, Phil. "San Marino: Collins eases Scotland's anxiety". The Independent (27 April 1995)

External links
 

1966 births
Living people
Sammarinese footballers
San Marino international footballers
Association football defenders
S.S. Cosmos players
A.C. Juvenes/Dogana players
S.S. Virtus players
S.C. Faetano players
S.S. Folgore Falciano Calcio players
S.P. La Fiorita players
A.S. San Giovanni players
Sammarinese expatriate footballers
Sammarinese expatriate sportspeople in Italy
Expatriate footballers in Italy